Caroga Lake is an unincorporated community and census-designated place (CDP) in the town of Caroga, Fulton County, New York, United States. The population was 518 at the 2010 census. The hamlet is in the southern part of the town of Caroga and is northwest of Gloversville. Two lakes, West Caroga Lake and East Caroga Lake are located next to the hamlet.

Geography
The community of Caroga Lake is situated in northern Fulton County in the southern Adirondack Mountains, centered on a peninsula between West Caroga Lake to the west and East Caroga Lake to the south. The CDP area includes both of the lakes and the developed land surrounding the lakes.

New York State Routes 10 and 29A intersect at the center of the community. NY 10 leads north  to Piseco Lake and south  to Canajoharie on the Mohawk River, while NY 29A leads southeast  to Gloversville. NY 29A follows NY 10 to the northwest out of town, then turns west towards Stratford,  from Caroga Lake.

Demographics

Recreational Opportunities
Caroga Lake CDP area was home to Sherman's Restaurant and Amusement Park from 1921 until the early 1970s. The shell of a park now hosts music and art events, including live bands and a fireworks show every 4th of July.

There is a New York State Campground located on the shore of East Caroga Lake that features 105 campsites, a picnic area, sandy beach, trailer dump station, bathhouse, hot showers and toilets.

References

Census-designated places in Fulton County, New York
Census-designated places in New York (state)